Karl Viktor von Wildsorf (18 January 1857, in Großhartmannsdorf, Saxony – 23 March 1920, in Dresden, Weimar Germany) was a German general of the infantry who served as the War Minister of the Kingdom of Saxony during World War I.

Biography 
Karl Viktor von Wildsorf was born in a small village in southern Saxony, near the Bohemian border. After passing the Abitur exam at König-Albert-Gymnasium in Freiberg, he enlisted in the Royal Saxon Army in 1875 as a one-year volunteer. After about 14 years service in his original regiment, the "Prinz Georg" Fusilier Regiment Nr. 108, Wilsdorf was promoted to lead a company in the Royal Saxon Army's 2nd Jäger Battalion, and his military career was underway. Following stints as a battalion commander, Wilsdorf was transferred to Dresden to replace Otto von Tettenborn as Commandant of the Saxon Cadet Corps. He then moved up to the Saxon War Ministry to serve as head of the Department for Personnel Affairs for then next seven years, going on active reserve status about one year prior to the outbreak of the Great War.

When the War began, von Wilsdorf was reactivated to function as the Chief of Staff for General Georg von Schweinitz, who had been appointed acting commanding general of the XIX. Army Corps in Leipzig. One month later, he found himself back in Dresden serving as War Minister Adolph von Carlowitz's provisional replacement. When it became clear after about one year that von Carlowitz would be remaining on the Front, General von Wilsdorf was permanently installed as Saxon War Minister in October 1915 by Friedrich August III and remained at this post for the remainder of the conflict. He went into retirement following the Armistice of November 1918 and died in Dresden in 1920.

Military ranks

References 

1857 births
1920 deaths
German Army generals of World War I
People from the Kingdom of Saxony
Saxon generals
Military personnel from Saxony
People from Mittelsachsen